RainSong is a musical instrument manufacturer company, currently based in Woodinville, Washington, and originally based in Kihei, Maui, Hawaii. RainSong makes high-end carbon fiber (graphite) bodied steel-string acoustic guitars, with past models including nylon string guitars, 12-string guitars, and a jazz archtop guitar.

Company 
RainSong Graphite Guitars is a guitar manufacturing company originally based out of Hawaii that recently moved to the mainland to Woodinville Washington near Seattle. Because the company was in such high demand, relocation allowed for easier distribution. In addition to the 30 states in the U.S., they can now be found in Canada, The United Kingdom, Japan, Germany, Austria, Switzerland, Singapore, and Australia. RainSong makes about four or five guitars a day and only about five hundred to one thousand in a year compared to larger companies like Fender and Gibson which make that much in a day. This attributes to the cost of the guitar, where they range from about $2,000 to $4,000 depending on the model you purchase, the twelve-string tends to be one of the most expensive.

Creator/Current owner 
The creator of RainSong, John Decker designed the guitar, like most inventions, out of the necessity for a product that didn't exist. This idea was sparked when Decker was playing guitar for a wedding in Hawaii when it started to pour. This posed a problem because his guitar was wooden and would warp after coming in contact with moisture, completely ruining the body of the guitar. He was caught in the dilemma of if he should continue to play and ruin his guitar or should he run for cover and risk angering the bride and family. After this experience, he was determined to create a guitar that could withstand the weather and humidity that Hawaii offered.

Decker had an extensive background in physics, specifically in plasma physics.  He earned his PhD in plasma physics in 1966 from Cambridge University then worked for the air force as a physics researcher. Then after he moved to Hawaii and worked as the manager of the air forces optical observatory. In 1981 he went into business for himself in cooperation with Luther Lorenzo Pimentel and was determined to create this guitar that he could play in any weather. 

After finding the perfect recipe for the guitar and making a successful business from it, he then retired and left the business to his son-in-law. Coomar took over the business from Decker, his father-in-law, and decided that keeping the company in Hawaii had too many business disadvantages. Coomar, who is originally from India and then graduated from the University of Southern California, decided to move the business to Woodinville in 2001 since one of his toolers, Beaver Machine Works owner Rod Brower, offered him a building for rent.

Manufacture 

John Decker's background and extensive research, conducted at the Sperry Rand research lab in Sudbury, Massachusetts where he focused on plasma stability helped him develop a guitar made from graphite. Using data research he conducted on the stiffness and density properties of wood, he figured out composite materials that had similar properties to this. Most materials, such as plastics and fiberglass, were rejected because they were too stiff or extremely heavy. He finally settled on graphite which is a composite material of carbon fibers in an epoxy matrix. The materials are shipped from Tulsa, Oklahoma, at subzero temperatures in order to keep the material malleable. It is then shaped, hardened and cured by baking at 200 degrees for several hours. This process uses the same technology for bonding the pieces of the bridge and neck together that is used in making planes and rockets and other satellite equipment, therefore its much stronger than any other bond classic guitars and made with like wood glues or epoxy which can still warp and decay with time and weather changes. No matter the weather, rain or shine, you can still play on the guitars, hence the name RainSong.

Sound 
Pure carbon guitars produce a tone that is clear, rich and resonant, similar to a piano, with a treble that rings with clarity and a bass that is warm without being muddy. It has showed up in the hands of performers including two longtime rockers, Steve Miller and Daryl Hall. Dr. Decker said the most responsive possible guitar soundboard would be one with infinite stiffness and zero mass, so that the energy from the slightest tug of a finger on a string would translate most efficiently into moving air instead of diffusing as heat in the structure of the instrument.

RainSong body styles 
RainSong offers five different body styles of their guitars within several different “series”. Their body types they offer which are shown in the graphic below are the DR (dreadnought), the JM, The OM, the WS, and the PA. Each is designed for a different effect and sound quality. Some are made to be louder or softer or just to be more visually pleasing or comfortable. Each of their series are based around an idea or concept. As of 2017 their series collections are named “Concert Hybrid Series” which are made to be good harmony guitars, “Hybrid Series” which are described to have a mellow blend effect on the tone at a more affordable price point in comparison to the other styles, “classic Series” which are engineered to have crystalline clarity in their tone, “Concert Series” which have a warmer tone to them, and last but not least the “Black Ice Series” which are the artistry guitars that feature intricate design patterns on the body of the guitar and every guitar is unique in both appearance and tone.

References

External links 
 

Guitar manufacturing companies of the United States
Companies based in Woodinville, Washington